Verduya's hap (Copadichromis trimaculatus)  is a species of haplochromine cichlid which is endemic to Lake Malawi where it has a lake wide range and so is found in Malawi, Mozambique, and Tanzania. This species occurs in open water, sometimes forming large shoals.

References

Verduya's hap
Fish described in 1960
Taxonomy articles created by Polbot